In chemistry, a polyoxometalate (abbreviated POM) is a polyatomic ion, usually an anion, that consists of three or more transition metal oxyanions linked together by shared oxygen atoms to form closed 3-dimensional frameworks. The metal atoms are usually group 6 (Mo, W) or less commonly group 5 (V, Nb, Ta) transition metals and Tc in their high oxidation states. Polyoxometalates are often colorless, orange or red diamagnetic anions. Two broad families are recognized, isopolymetalates, composed of only one kind of metal and oxide, and heteropolymetalates, composed of one metal, oxide, and a main group oxyanion (phosphate, silicate, etc.). Many exceptions to these general statements exist.

Formation
These species condense via the process called olation. The replacement of terminal M=O bonds, which in fact have triple bond character, is compensated by the increase in coordination number. The nonobservation of polyoxochromate cages is rationalized by the small radius of Cr(VI), which may not accommodate octahedral coordination geometry.

Condensation of the  species entails loss of water and the formation of  linkages. The stoichiometry for hexamolybdate is shown:
6 MoO4^2- + 10 HCl -> [Mo6O19]^2- + 10 Cl- + 5 H2O
An abbreviated condensation sequence illustrated with vanadates is:
4 VO4^3- + 8 H+ -> V4O12^4- + 4 H2O
5 V4O12^4- + 12 H+ -> 2 V10O26(OH)2^4- + 4 H2O

When such acidifications are conducted in the presence of phosphate or silicate, heteropolymetalate result. For example, the phosphotungstate anion  consists of a framework of twelve octahedral tungsten oxyanions surrounding a central phosphate group.

History

Ammonium phosphomolybdate,  anion, was reported in 1826. The isostructural phosphotungstate anion was characterized by X-ray crystallography 1934. This structure is called the Keggin structure after its discoverer.

The 1970's witnessed the introduction of quaternary ammonium salts of POMs. This innovation enabled systematic study without the complications of hydrolysis and acid/base reactions. The introduction of 17O NMR spectroscopy allowed the structural characterization of POMs in solution.

Ramazzoite, the first example of a mineral with a polyoxometalate cation, was described in 2016 in Mt. Ramazzo Mine, Liguria, Italy.

Structure and bonding
The typical framework building blocks are polyhedral units, with 6-coordinate metal centres. Usually, these units share edges and/or vertices. The coordination number of the oxide ligands varies according to their location in the cage. Surface oxides tend to be terminal or doubly bridging oxo ligands. Interior oxides are typically triply bridging or even octahedral. POMs are sometimes viewed as soluble fragments of metal oxides.

Recurring structural motifs allow POMs to be classified. Iso-polyoxometalates (isopolyanions) feature octahedral metal centers. The heteropolymetalates form distinct structures because the main group center is usually tetrahedral. The Lindqvist and Keggin structures are common motifs for iso- and heteropolyanions, respectively.

Polyoxometalates typically exhibit coordinate metal-oxo bonds of different multiplicity and strength. In a typical POM such as the Keggin structure , each addenda center connects to single terminal oxo ligand, four bridging µ2-O ligands and one bridging µ3-O deriving from the central heterogroup. Metal–metal bonds in polyoxometalates are normally absent and owing to this property, F. Albert Cotton opposed to consider polyoxometalates as form of cluster materials. However, metal-metal bonds are not completely absent in polyoxometalates and they are often present among the highly reduced species.

Polymolybdates and tungstates
The polymolybdates and polytungstates are derived, formally at least, from the dianionic [MO4]2- precursors. The most common units for polymolybdates and polyoxotungstates are the octahedral {MO6} centers, sometimes slightly distorted. Some polymolybdates contain pentagonal bipyramidal units. These building blocks are found in the molybdenum blues, which are mixed valence compounds.

Polyoxotechnetate

The first empirically isolated polyoxotechnetate was the red . It contains both Tc(V) and Tc(VII) in ratio 4: 16 and is obtained as the hydronium salt  by concentrating an  solution. Corresponding ammonium polyoxotechnetate salt was recently isolated from trifluoromethanesulfonic acid and it has very similar structure.

Polyoxotantalates, niobates, and vanadates 
The polyniobates, polytantalates, and vanadates are derived, formally at least, from highly charged [MO4]3- precursors. These octaanions form in strongly basic conditions from alkali melts of the extended metal oxides (M2O5), or in the case of Nb even from mixtures of niobic acid and alkali metal hydroxides in aqueous solution. The hexatantalate can also be prepared by condensation of peroxotantalate  in alkaline media. These polyoxometalates display an anomalous aqueous solubility trend of their alkali metal salts inasmuch as their Cs+ and Rb+ salts are more soluble than their Na+ and Li+ salts. The opposite trend is observed in group 6 POMs.

The decametalates with the formula  (M = Nb, Ta) are isostructural with decavanadate. They are formed exclusively by edge-sharing {MO6} octahedra (the structure of decatungstate  comprises edge-sharing and corner-sharing tungstate octahedra).

Heteroatoms

Heteroatoms aside from the transition metal are a defining feature of heteropolymetalates.

Giant structures

Polyoxomolybdates include the wheel-shaped molybdenum blue anions and spherical keplerates. The cluster } consists of more than 700 atoms and is the size of a small protein. The anion is in the form of a tire (the cavity has a diameter of more than 20 Å) and an extremely large inner and outer surface. The incorporation of lanthanide ions in molybdenum blues is particularly intriguing. Lanthanides can behave like Lewis acids and perform catalytic properties. Lanthanide-containing polyoxometalates show chemoselectivity and are also able to form inorganic–organic adducts, which can be exploited in chiral recognition.

Oxoalkoxometalates 
Oxoalkoxometalates are clusters that contain both oxide and alkoxide ligands. Typically they lack terminal oxo ligands. Examples include the dodecatitanate Ti12O16(OPri)16 (where OPri stands for an alkoxy group), the iron oxoalkoxometalates and iron and copper Keggin ions.

Sulfido, imido, and other O-replaced oxometalates
The terminal oxide centers of polyoxometalate framework can in certain cases be replaced with other ligands, such as S2−, Br−, and NR2−. Sulfur-substituted POMs are called polyoxothiometalates. Other ligands replacing the oxide ions have also been demonstrated, such as nitrosyl and alkoxy groups.

Polyfluoroxometalate are yet another class of O-replaced oxometalates.

Other
Numerous hybrid organic–inorganic materials that contain POM cores,

Illustrative of the diverse structures of POM is the ion , which has face-shared octahedra with Mo atoms at the vertices of an icosahedron).

Use and aspirational applications

Oxidation catalysts
POMs are employed as commercial catalysts for oxidation of organic compounds.

Efforts continue to extend this theme. POM-based aerobic oxidations have been promoted as alternatives to chlorine-based wood pulp bleaching processes, a method of decontaminating water, and a method to catalytically produce formic acid from biomass (OxFA process). Polyoxometalates have been shown to catalyse water splitting.

Molecular electronics
Some POMs exhibit unusual magnetic properties, which has prompted visions of many applications. One example is storage devices called qubits. non-volatile (permanent) storage components, also known as flash memory devices.

Drugs
Potential antitumor and antiviral drugs. The Anderson-type polyoxomolybdates and heptamolybdates exhibit activity for suppressing the growth of some tumors. In the case of (NH3Pr)6[Mo7O24], activity appears related to its redox properties. The Wells-Dawson structure can efficiently inhibit amyloid β (Aβ) aggregation in a therapeutic strategy for Alzheimer's disease. antibacterial and antiviral uses.

See also
 Superatom
 Perovskite
 Metal aromaticity

References

Further reading

Oxyanions
Oxometallates
Cluster chemistry
Catalysts